

List

See also 
Grammy Award
Grammy Hall of Fame
List of Grammy Hall of Fame Award recipients (A–D)
List of Grammy Hall of Fame Award recipients (J–P)
List of Grammy Hall of Fame Award recipients (Q–Z)

References

 E-I
Music award winners